Elvis Hajradinović (Macedonian: Eлвиc Xajpaдинoвиќ; born 1 August 1972) is a retired Macedonian football player of Bosniak descent. He is currently a player agent.

Club career
Hajradinović spent the majority of his career in the German Regionalliga West.

Honours
Bundesliga: 1
 1991

References

External links
 
 

1972 births
Living people
Macedonian people of Bosnia and Herzegovina descent
Association football defenders
Yugoslav footballers
Macedonian footballers
FK Vardar players
1. FC Kaiserslautern players
1. FC Kaiserslautern II players
Borussia Dortmund players
SC Paderborn 07 players
Wuppertaler SV players
Rot-Weiss Essen players
Bundesliga players
Regionalliga players
Oberliga (football) players
Macedonian expatriate footballers
Expatriate footballers in Germany
Macedonian expatriate sportspeople in Germany
Association football agents